This is a list of electoral division results for the Australian 2001 federal election in the state of New South Wales.

Overall results

Results by division

Banks 
 This section is an excerpt from Electoral results for the Division of Banks § 2001

Barton 
 This section is an excerpt from Electoral results for the Division of Barton § 2001

Bennelong 
 This section is an excerpt from Electoral results for the Division of Bennelong § 2001

Berowra 
 This section is an excerpt from Electoral results for the Division of Berowra § 2001

Blaxland 
 This section is an excerpt from Electoral results for the Division of Blaxland § 2001

Bradfield 
 This section is an excerpt from Electoral results for the Division of Bradfield § 2001

Calare 
 This section is an excerpt from Electoral results for the Division of Calare § 2001

Charlton 
 This section is an excerpt from Electoral results for the Division of Charlton § 2001

Chifley 
 This section is an excerpt from Electoral results for the Division of Chifley § 2001

Cook 
 This section is an excerpt from Electoral results for the Division of Cook § 2001

Cowper 
 This section is an excerpt from Electoral results for the Division of Cowper § 2001

Cunningham 
 This section is an excerpt from Electoral results for the Division of Cunningham § 2001

Dobell 
 This section is an excerpt from Electoral results for the Division of Dobell § 2001

Eden-Monaro 
 This section is an excerpt from Electoral results for the Division of Eden-Monaro § 2001

Farrer 
 This section is an excerpt from Electoral results for the Division of Farrer § 2001

Fowler 
 This section is an excerpt from Electoral results for the Division of Fowler § 2001

Gilmore 
 This section is an excerpt from Electoral results for the Division of Gilmore § 2001

Grayndler 
 This section is an excerpt from Electoral results for the Division of Grayndler § 2001

Greenway 
 This section is an excerpt from Electoral results for the Division of Greenway § 2001

Gwydir 
 This section is an excerpt from Electoral results for the Division of Gwydir § 2001

Hughes 
 This section is an excerpt from Electoral results for the Division of Hughes § 2001

Hume 
 This section is an excerpt from Electoral results for the Division of Hume § 2001

Hunter 
 This section is an excerpt from Electoral results for the Division of Hunter § 2001

Kingsford Smith 
 This section is an excerpt from Electoral results for the Division of Kingsford Smith § 2001

Lindsay 
 This section is an excerpt from Electoral results for the Division of Lindsay § 2001

Lowe 
 This section is an excerpt from Electoral results for the Division of Lowe § 2001

Lyne 
 This section is an excerpt from Electoral results for the Division of Lyne § 2001

Macarthur 
 This section is an excerpt from Electoral results for the Division of Macarthur § 2001

Mackellar 
 This section is an excerpt from Electoral results for the Division of Mackellar § 2001

Macquarie 
 This section is an excerpt from Electoral results for the Division of Macquarie § 2001

Mitchell 
 This section is an excerpt from Electoral results for the Division of Mitchell § 2001

New England 
 This section is an excerpt from Electoral results for the Division of New England § 2001

Newcastle 
 This section is an excerpt from Electoral results for the Division of Newcastle2001

North Sydney 
 This section is an excerpt from Electoral results for the Division of North Sydney § 2001

Page 
 This section is an excerpt from Electoral results for the Division of Page § 2001

Parkes 
 This section is an excerpt from Electoral results for the Division of Parkes § 2001

Parramatta 
 This section is an excerpt from Electoral results for the Division of Parramatta § 2001

Paterson 
 This section is an excerpt from Electoral results for the Division of Paterson § 2001

Prospect 
 This section is an excerpt from Electoral results for the Division of Prospect § 2001

Reid 
 This section is an excerpt from Electoral results for the Division of Reid § 2001

Richmond 
 This section is an excerpt from Electoral results for the Division of Richmond § 2001

Riverina 
 This section is an excerpt from Electoral results for the Division of Riverina § 2001

Robertson 
 This section is an excerpt from Electoral results for the Division of Robertson § 2001

Shortland 
 This section is an excerpt from Electoral results for the Division of Shortland § 2001

Sydney 
 This section is an excerpt from Electoral results for the Division of Sydney § 2001

Throsby 
 This section is an excerpt from Electoral results for the Division of Throwsby § 2001

Warringah 
 This section is an excerpt from Electoral results for the Division of Warringah § 2001

Watson 
 This section is an excerpt from Electoral results for the Division of Watson § 2001

Wentworth 
 This section is an excerpt from Electoral results for the Division of Wentworth § 2001

Werriwa 
 This section is an excerpt from Electoral results for the Division of Werriwa § 2001

See also 

 Members of the Australian House of Representatives, 2001–2004

References 

New South Wales 2001